Lieutenant General Carsten Jacobson (born 22 June 1955 in Hamburg) is a retired German Army officer and Deputy ISAF Commander.

Military career
Jacobson joined the Bundeswehr in 1974 and trained as a tank commander. He attended the German Fuehrungsakademie where he undertook staff officer training from 1986 to 1988.

Jacobson attended the British Army's Staff College, Camberley between 1990 and 1992. He served abroad as part of SFOR in Bosnia and Herzegowina between 1997 and 1998 and then served with KFOR in 1999. He was transferred to the Embassy of Germany, Washington, D.C. in 2001 and served there until 2005. He was transferred to the Allied Rapid Reaction Corps (ARRC) headquarters in Mönchengladbach in 2007. He became Chief of Staff for the German Army Forces Command in 2009 and he became spokesman for ISAF in 2011.

In 2012, he became commander of the 1st Panzer Division and in 2014 he became Deputy Commander of ISAF.

Honors 
 Badge of Honour of the Bundeswehr in Bronze (1983), in Silver (1989) and Gold (1994)
 German Armed Forces Service Medal SFOR (1998),
 NATO-Medal (1998)
 Legion of Merit (2005).

Private life 

Jacobson has a British wife, Sally Jane (nee McBride), a former Women's Royal Army Corps officer. They married in 1979 and have two sons.

References

1955 births
Living people
Military personnel from Hamburg
Lieutenant generals of the German Army
People of the War in Afghanistan (2001–2021)
German military personnel of the War in Afghanistan (2001–2021)
Recipients of the Badge of Honour of the Bundeswehr
Foreign recipients of the Legion of Merit
Graduates of the Staff College, Camberley